A second referendum on the Maastricht Treaty was held in Denmark on 18 May 1993. After rejecting the treaty in a referendum the previous year, this time it was approved by 56.7% of voters with an 86.5% turnout.

Background
It was the second attempt to ratify the Maastricht Treaty, which could not come into effect unless ratified by all members of the European Union. Thus, the Edinburgh Agreement granted Denmark four exceptions from the Maastricht Treaty, leading to its eventual ratification.

Results

By county

Aftermath

When the result of the referendum was announced, the outcome and frustrations about the referendum being held only a year after the Danes had rejected the previous treaty led to riots in the Nørrebro area of Copenhagen, during which police shot and wounded at least 11 people "to prevent an injured colleague being stoned to death". These 11 people, not in critical conditions, were subsequently treated for gunshot wounds as a result of the shooting. 90 police officers were injured during the riots.

Notes

History of the European Union
Referendums in Denmark
Denmark
1993 in Denmark
1993 in international relations
1993 in the European Union
Denmark and the European Union
Referendums related to the European Union
May 1993 events in Europe
Treaty on European Union